Bicycle Days is the debut novel by American author John Burnham Schwartz published in 1989 on his 24th birthday. It began as an undergraduate thesis for Harvard's East Asian Studies department and became a critically acclaimed bestseller. It was inspired by his time living in Japan.

Plot Introduction
The book follows Alec Stern as he arrives in Tokyo, newly graduated from Yale. He starts a new job, living with a Japanese family; the book portrays his life in Japan as he adapts to the culture, made far easier by his ability to speak Japanese ...

Reception
Reviews were generally positive :
The New York Times, "Reminiscent of A Good Man in Africa...or one of Kingsley Amis's gentler comodies of manners."
Publishers Weekly called this a "promising, if overly self-absorbed debut novel."
People commented "it's too bad Schwartz wrote his intimate story in the third person. As it is, Schwartz outlines the most incidental happenings of Alec's life without letting us get inside his mind. It's as if a great deal yet not nearly enough has been revealed in Bicycle Days."

External links

References

1989 American novels
Novels set in Tokyo
Simon & Schuster books
1989 debut novels
Japan in non-Japanese culture
Summit Books books